"Lily, Rosemary and the Jack of Hearts", is an epic narrative ballad by the American singer-songwriter Bob Dylan released as the seventh song (or the second track on Side Two of the vinyl) on his 1975 album Blood on the Tracks. It is known for its complex plot and nearly nine-minute running time. It is one of five songs on Blood on the Tracks that Dylan initially recorded in New York City in September 1974 and then re-recorded in Minneapolis in December that year; the latter version became the album track.

Characters and plot 
The song features a large cast of characters and an elliptical plot:

Characters
 
 The main character in the song is "The Jack of Hearts", who has recently come into town as a leader of a gang of bank robbers. ("The boys finally made it through the wall and cleaned out the bank safe... but they couldn't go no further without the Jack of Hearts".)
 The female protagonists are Lily and Rosemary. Both are referred to in royal terms ("like a queen without a crown" and "Lily was a princess"). Rosemary is Big Jim's long-suffering wife and is ultimately executed for his murder. Lily is a dancer who is Big Jim's mistress (wearing a ring symbolizing this) and also a former lover of the Jack of Hearts. 
 Big Jim is the wealthiest person in town: "He owned the town's only diamond mine" (i.e. he is the "King" of Diamonds). He is married to Rosemary and having a longstanding affair with Lily. He is killed at the climax of the song, though Dylan leaves it ambiguous who does the deed. The lyrics describe Big Jim as a greedy man who destroys all that he touches. 
 The Hanging Judge; a patron of the bar where the plot plays out. The character is referred to as a drunk and is intoxicated for the bulk of the song. However, he is "sober" the next day when he oversees Rosemary being executed for Big Jim's death.

Plot 
The song takes place in a cabaret in an unnamed town where most of the residents "with any sense" have already left. The town's bank is being targeted by a gang of thieves led by an enigmatic figure called "The Jack of Hearts". The Jack of Hearts appears inside the cabaret right before the show. Big Jim and his wife Rosemary are in attendance of the show, though they arrive separately and it is apparent that Big Jim intends to use the night to pursue his affair with Lily. After her performance, Lily meets the Jack of Hearts in her dressing room with romantic intentions, but Big Jim makes his way to the dressing room as well, followed by Rosemary who has been driven to despair by her years of mistreatment at the hands of Big Jim. Big Jim is going to shoot the Jack of Hearts but is killed by a penknife in the back wielded by Rosemary (her "one good deed before she dies"). "The next day", Rosemary is executed, a hanging overseen by "the hanging judge", another figure in town who is in attendance at the cabaret the night before.

The fate of the Jack of Hearts is left ambiguous. He is described at the end of the song only as "missing", as Rosemary is on the gallows, his gang across the river with the safe from the bank, and Lily contemplating the events of her life.

Extra verse 
There is an extra verse on the Bob Dylan website and in the published sheet music that is not in the album version (right after the "backstage manager" verse):

Lily's arms were locked around the man that she dearly loved to touch,
She forgot all about the man she couldn't stand who hounded her so much.
"I've missed you so," she said to him, and he felt she was sincere,
But just beyond the door he felt jealousy and fear.
Just another night in the life of the Jack of Hearts.

This verse was recorded during the album's New York sessions and can be found on the deluxe version of The Bootleg Series Vol. 14: More Blood, More Tracks. This version is slower and more somber, even mournful, reflecting the approach of the other New York sessions. The version on Blood on the Tracks was recorded later, in Minneapolis, and reflects Dylan's attempts, following his brother's advice, to make the album less difficult and intense. The verse also appears in Joan Baez's cover of the song.

The following verse was considered in later years as a follow on for those who asked what happened to Lily and the Jack of Hearts? This was added at the song's end.

Just before midnight, the boys pushed away from the shore,
They laughed and they toasted and they talked about their score.
The bags were full of money, they were free as a bird.
They swore a bloody oath, never to say a word.
Now just a faded memory remains of the Jack of Hearts.

Reception and interpretations 
According to Tim Riley of National Public Radio, "'Lily, Rosemary and the Jack of Hearts' is an intricately evasive allegory about 'romantic facades' that hide 'criminal motives', and the way one character's business triggers a series of recriminations from people he doesn't even know".

In their book Bob Dylan All the Songs: The Story Behind Every Track, authors Philippe Margotin and Jean-Michel Guesdon note that the "protagonists seem to play with their life as if  it were a game of chance. Love is seen as comedy, life as a game of a chance. There is no doubt about what Dylan thought of justice, embodied by an alcoholic judge, imposing sentences with merciless severity".  

Dylan scholar Tony Attwood sees it as a Western ballad, the "American Wild West" period setting of which "sets it completely apart" from any of the other songs on Blood on the Tracks, but he also notes that it is a "superb song, a brilliant example of how to tell a story in a song".

Critic Dale Nickey cited it in 2013 as being the "greatest 'story song' yet written".

Other versions
The New York recording session of "Lily, Rosemary and the Jack of Hearts" was released on the deluxe edition of The Bootleg Series Vol. 14: More Blood, More Tracks in 2018, with the second take of the song also included on the single-CD and 2-LP versions of the album.  The deluxe version of  The Bootleg Series Vol. 14 also included a remix of the December 1974 master issued on Blood on the Tracks.

Live performance
According to his official website, Dylan has played the song live only once, on May 25, 1976, in Salt Lake City.

Covers 
 Joan Baez included a performance of "Lily, Rosemary and the Jack of Hearts" on her 1976 live album From Every Stage. This includes the extra verse from Dylan's first recording.
 In 2002, Mary Lee's Corvette included "Lily, Rosemary and the Jack of Hearts" in their song-for-song live cover performance of "Blood on the Tracks"
 American singer-songwriter Tom Russell recorded a cover of the song with Eliza Gilkyson and Joe Ely for his 2004 album, Indians Cowboys Horses and Dogs.

In popular culture
 "Lily, Rosemary and the Jack of Hearts" is heavily referenced in the song "The Getaway" by the American indie pop band TV Girl on their first studio album French Exit.
The Dylan recording was featured in Manchester by the Sea (2016) starring Casey Affleck.
There have been two screenplays written based on the song: one by John Kaye that was commissioned by Dylan, and another written by James Byron. Neither screenplay ever became a film.

References

External links 
Lyrics at Bob Dylan's official site
Chords at Dylanchords

1975 songs
Songs written by Bob Dylan
Bob Dylan songs
Joan Baez songs
Song recordings produced by Bob Dylan
Murder ballads